Fraxinus lanuginosa (Japanese ash; Japanese: アオダモ Aodamo) is a species of ash native to Japan and to the Primorye region of eastern Russia.

Fraxinus lanuginosais a medium-sized deciduous tree growing to 10–15 m tall with a trunk up to 50 cm diameter. The bark is smooth, dark grey. The buds are pale pinkish-brown to grey-brown, with a dense covering of short grey hairs. The leaves are in opposite pairs, pinnate, 10–15 cm long, with 3-7 leaflets; the leaflets are broad ovoid, 4–7 cm long and 2–4 cm broad, downy at the base on the underside, with a finely serrated margin, and short indistinct petiolules. The flowers are produced in panicles after the new leaves appear in late spring, each flower with four slender creamy white petals 5–7 mm long; they are pollinated by insects. The fruit is a slender samara 2–4 cm long and 3–5 mm broad, reddish, ripening brown.<ref name=jawiki>This article includes text translated from the Japanese Wikipedia article アオダモ</ref>Japan Trees Guide: Fraxinus lanuginosa (in Japanese; google translation)Bean, W. J. (1978). Trees and Shrubs Hardy in the British Isles 8th ed., vol. 2. John Murray .

In the population of F. lanuginosa native to central Hokkaidō, northern Japan, "hermaphrodites and males commonly coexist in populations of the species. Hermaphrodites and males have identical flowering phenologies and pollen morphologies".

It is closely related to Fraxinus ornus from Europe and southwest Asia, sharing similar flower characters.

Cultivation and uses
The wood is strong and hard, with a tenacity that allows it to be bent into curves, such as for making tennis rackets and skis. Its wood is also used in the making of baseball bats and electric guitars.

References

External links
Peter B. Kitin, Tomoyuki Fujii, Hisashi Abe and Ryo Funada (2004). Anatomy of the vessel network within and between tree rings of Fraxinus lanuginosa (Oleaceae). American Journal of Botany'' 91: 779-788. Available online
Henriette's Herbal Homepage, photo Fraxinus lanuginosa

lanuginosa
Trees of Japan
Trees of Asia
Plants described in 1926